Chang Hsueh-liang (June 3, 1901 – October 15, 2001), also romanized as Zhang Xueliang and known later in life as Peter H. L. Chang, was the warlord of Manchuria and commander-in-chief of the Northeastern Army after the assassination of his father, Zhang Zuolin. A reformer who was sympathetic to nationalist ideas, he completed the official reunification of China at the end of the Warlord Era by pledging loyalty to the Nationalist government in Nanjing. He nonetheless retained Manchuria's de facto autonomy until the Empire of Japan invaded and occupied the region in 1931. He was frustrated by Chiang Kai-shek's policy of "first internal pacification, then external resistance" and helped plan and lead the 1936 Xi'an Incident. Northeastern soldiers under Chang's command arrested Chiang to force him to negotiate a Second United Front with the Chinese Communist Party against Japan. Chiang eventually agreed, but upon his release he had Chang arrested and sentenced to 50 years of house arrest, first in mainland China and then in Taiwan. Although never personally a communist, Chang is regarded by the Chinese Communist Party and the People's Republic of China as a patriotic hero for his role in ending the encirclement campaigns and beginning the war of resistance against Japan.

Early life
Chang Hsueh-liang was born in Haicheng, Liaoning province on June 3, 1901. Chang was educated by private tutors and, unlike his father, the warlord Zhang Zuolin, he felt at ease in the company of westerners.

Career
Chang graduated from Fengtian Military Academy, was made a colonel in the Fengtian Army, and appointed the commander of his father's bodyguards in 1919. In 1921 he was sent to Japan to observe military maneuvers, where he developed a special interest in aircraft. Later, he developed an air corps for the Fengtian Army, which was widely used in the battles that took place within the Great Wall during the 1920s. In 1922, he was promoted to Major General and commanded an army-sized force. Two years later, he was also made commander of the air units. Upon the death of his father in 1928, he succeeded him as the leader of the Northeast Peace Preservation Forces (popularly "Northeastern Army"), which controlled China's northeastern provinces of Heilongjiang, Fengtian, and Jilin. In December of the same year he proclaimed his allegiance to the Kuomintang (KMT; Chinese Nationalist Party).

Warlord to republican general

The Japanese believed that Chang Hsueh-liang, who was known as a womanizer and an opium addict, would be much more subject to Japanese influence than was his father.  On this premise, an officer of the Japanese Kwantung Army therefore killed his father, Zhang Zuolin by exploding a bomb above his train while it crossed under a railroad bridge. Surprisingly, the younger Chang proved to be more independent and skilled than anyone had expected and declared his support for Chiang Kai-shek, leading to the reunification of China in 1928. With the assistance of Australian journalist William Henry Donald and Dr. Harry Willis Miller, he overcame his opium addiction in 1933 with the administering of Cantharidin auto-serum therapy.

He was given the nickname "Hero of History" by PRC historians because of his desire to reunite China and rid it of Japanese invaders; and was willing to pay the price and become "vice" leader of China (not because it was good that he was supporting the Kuomintang). In order to rid his command of Japanese influence, he had two prominent pro-Tokyo officials executed in front of the assembled guests at a dinner party in January 1929. It was a hard decision for him to make. The two had powers over the heads of others. In May 1929, relations between the Kuomintang Nanjing and the excessively strengthened Feng Yuxiang worsened. In addition, the Japanese government, dissatisfied with the pro-Kuomintang policy of Zhang Zuolin, and now his son, threatened to "take the most decisive measures to ensure that the Kuomintang flag never flies over Manchuria". The "Young Marshal" supported Nanjing, and Feng's troops were pushed back to the outlying provinces of Chahar and Suiyuan, and in July 1929, Japan officially recognized Kuomintang China. At the same time, Zhang Xueliang and Chiang Kai-shek held a personal meeting in Beiping, at which a decision was made on the armed seizure of the Chinese Eastern Railway or CER. By pushing Zhang Xueliang to take this step, Chiang Kai-shek sought to make the Young Marshal completely dependent on Nanjing and at the same time raise his prestige and get most of the profits from the operation of the CER at the disposal of Nanjing. Zhang Xueliang, in turn, believed that the capture of the CER would strengthen his position in the Northeast, allow him to personally manage the profits of the CER, and ensure his independence from Nanjing. As a result, on July 10, 1929, the Conflict on the CER began. However, the Red Army showed a higher combat capability, and the conflict ended with the signing of the Khabarovsk Protocol of December 22, 1929.

In 1930, when warlords Feng Yuxiang and Yan Xishan attempted to overthrow Chiang Kai-shek's Kuomintang government, Chang stepped in to support the Nanjing-based government against the Northern warlords in exchange for control of the key railroads in Hebei and the customs revenues from the port city of Tianjin. A year later, in the September 18 Mukden Incident, Japanese troops attacked Chang's forces in Shenyang in order to provoke a full-on war with China, which Chiang did not want to face until his forces were stronger.  In accordance with this strategy, Zhang's armies withdrew from the front lines without significant engagements, leading to the effective Japanese occupation of Zhang's former northeastern domain. There has been speculation that Chiang Kai-Shek wrote a letter to Chang asking him to pull his forces back, but Zhang later stated that he himself issued the orders. Apparently, Chang was aware of how weak his forces were compared to the Japanese and wished to preserve his position by retaining a sizeable army. Nonetheless, this would still be in line with Chiang's overall strategic standings. Chang later traveled in Europe before returning to China to take command of the Encirclement Campaigns, first in Hebei-Henan-Anhui and later in the Northwest.

Xi'an incident

On April 6, 1936, Chang met with CPC delegate Zhou Enlai to plan the end of the Chinese Civil War. KMT leader Generalissimo Chiang Kai-shek at the time took a passive position against Japan and considered the communists to be a greater danger to the Republic of China than the Japanese, and his overall strategy was to annihilate the communists before focusing his efforts on the Japanese. He believed that "communism was a cancer while the Japanese represented a superficial wound."  Growing nationalist anger against Japan made this position very unpopular, and led to Chang's action against Chiang, known as the Xi'an Incident.

In December 1936, Chang and General Yang Hucheng kidnapped Chiang, imprisoning him until he agreed to form a united front with the communists against the Japanese invasion. After two weeks of negotiations, Chiang agreed to unite with the communists and drive the Japanese out of China. When Chiang was released on December 26, Chang chose to return to the capital city of Nanjing with him; once they were away from Chang's loyal troops, Chiang had him placed under house arrest. From then on, he was under constant watch and lived near the Nationalist capital city, wherever it moved to.

Later life from 1949 

In 1949, Chang was transferred to Taiwan, where he remained under house arrest for the next 40 years in a villa in Taipei's northern suburbs, where he received occasional guests.  Much of his time was spent studying Ming dynasty literature, the Manchu language, collecting Chinese fan paintings, calligraphy and other works of art by illustrious artists (a collection of more than 200 works, using his studio's name "Dingyuanzhai", was auctioned with tremendous success by Sotheby's on 10 April 1994). 

Zhang studied the New Testament Bible. In 1964, he formally married Edith Chao, daughter of a senior official, who left her family in her teens to become his companion and later followed him into exile. His first wife, Ms. Yu, said she was so moved by Ms. Chao's devotion that she released her husband from his vows. Chang and his wife, Edith, became devout Christians who also regularly attended Sunday services at the Methodist chapel in Shilin, a Taipei suburb, with Chiang Kai-Shek's family. After Chiang's death in 1975, his freedom was officially restored.

Death
Chang emigrated to Honolulu, Hawaii in 1995. There were numerous pleas for him to visit mainland China, but Chang declined, citing his political closeness to the KMT. He died of pneumonia at the age of 100 at Straub Hospital in Honolulu, and was buried in Hawaii.

Awards 
:
 Order of Rank and Merit (1920)
 :
 Order of National Glory
 Order of Blue Sky and White Sun with Grand Cordon
 Order of Wen-Hu, 1st class, twice (1919, 1921)
 :
 Commandeur of the Legion of Honor
 : 
 Order of the Rising Sun
  Order of the Sacred Treasure, second class

(-1928)

Family
Parents
Zhang Zuolin (張作霖 Chang Tso-lin) (1875-1928), father of Chang, Warlord of Manchuria, assassinated by the Japanese
Zhao Chungui (趙春桂) (?-1912), mother of Chang

Spouses
Yu Feng Tze (于鳳至 Yu Fengzhi) (c. 1899–1990), known in the U.S. as Feng Tze Chang, first wife of Chang (m. 1916; div. 1964), immigrated to the U.S. in 1940, died in Los Angeles, CA
Gu Ruiyu (谷瑞玉) (1904-1946), concubine of Chang (m. 1924; div. 1931)
Edith Chao Chang (趙一荻 Zhao Yidi) (1912-2000), mistress and later second wife of Chang (m. 1964), immigrated with him to the U.S. in 1995, died in Honolulu, HI

Children
Pauline Tao, born Chang Lu-ying (張閭瑛 Zhang Lüying) (c. 1916-), eldest daughter born to Yu, resides in the U.S.
Martin Chang Lu-hsun (張閭珣 Zhang Lüxun) (c. 1918–1986), eldest son born to Yu, died in Taipei
Raymond Chang Lu-yu (張閭玗 Zhang Lüyu) (c. 1919–1981), second son born to Yu, died in Los Angeles, CA
Chang Lu-chi (張閭琪 Zhang Lüqi) (c. 1920–1929), third son born to Yu
Robert Chang Lu-lin (張閭琳 Zhang Lülin) (1930-), illegitimate son born to Chao, resides in the U.S.

Siblings
Zhang Xueming (張學銘 Chang Hsueh-ming) (1908-1983), defected to the Communists, died in Beijing
Hsueh Tseng Chang (張學曾 Zhang Xuezeng) (1911-2004), died in Novato, CA
Zhang Xuesi (張學思 Chang Hsueh-ssu) (1916-1970), defected to the Communists, died in China
Henry Chang Hsueh-sen (張學森 Zhang Xuesen) (1920-1995), died in Beijing while visiting
Zhang Xuejun (張學浚 Chang Hsueh-chun) (1922-1984), died in Taiwan
Zhang Xueying (張學英 Chang Hsueh-ying) (1924-?)
Zhang Xuequan (張學銓 Chang Hsueh-chuan) (1925-1992 or 1996), died in Tianjin

In popular culture
 Chang was portrayed by Andy Lau in a cameo appearance in the 1994 martial arts film Drunken Master II. 
 Chang was centrally featured in the 1981 Chinese film The Xi'an Incident (Xi'an Shibian), directed by Cheng Yin, with Chang played by Jin Ange.
 A 2007 TV series on the Xi'an Incident was produced and aired in mainland China, with Chang Hsueh-liang being portrayed by Hu Jun.
 Chang is a main figure in the American novel Soul Slip Peak (2013).
 The Peter H. L. Chang reading room at Columbia University's Butler Library is named after Chang. The library hosts a collection of Chang's papers.
 Beijing microbrewery Great Leap Brewing named its Little General IPA after Chang.
 A Chinese TV series titled  is based on Chang's life.

See also 

 Warlord era
 History of the Republic of China
 Military of the Republic of China
 Politics of the Republic of China
 Sino-German cooperation (1911–1941)

Notes

References

Further reading
 Matray, James I., ed. East Asia and the United States: an encyclopedia of relations since 1784. (2 vol, Greenwood, 2002) 2:700.
 Mitter, Rana. "The Last Warlord" History Today (Feb 2004), Vol. 54 Issue 2, p28-33 online
 Itoh, Mayumi. The Making of China’s War with Japan: Zhou Enlai and Zhang Xueliang (Springer, 2016).
 Shai, Aron. Zhang Xueliang: The General Who Never Fought (Springer, 2012) 
 Yilin, Jin. "Yan Xishan’s Activities Opposing Chiang Kai-shek and Zhang Xueliang before and after the Nanjing-Guangdong Conflict." Modern Chinese History Studies 5 (2005): 2.

 Obituaries

External links

 

1901 births
2001 deaths
Politicians from Anshan
Chinese Christians
Chinese centenarians
Men centenarians
Converts to Christianity from Buddhism
National Revolutionary Army generals from Liaoning
Republic of China warlords from Liaoning
Deaths from pneumonia in Hawaii
Children of national leaders of China
Taiwanese people from Liaoning
Chinese Civil War refugees
People of the Northern Expedition
People of the Central Plains War
Recipients of the Order of Blue Sky and White Sun
Commandeurs of the Légion d'honneur
Recipients of the Order of the Rising Sun
Recipients of the Order of the Sacred Treasure, 2nd class